The 2016–17 season was Aston Villa's first season in the Football League Championship following their relegation from the Premier League last season in their 142nd year in existence. It was also their first season in the second tier of English football since the formation of the Premier League.

On 2 June 2016, Roberto Di Matteo was appointed the manager of newly the relegated Championship club, working under the new chairman Tony Xia. Di Matteo's former Chelsea teammate Steve Clarke was appointed as his assistant on the same day. On 3 October 2016, Di Matteo was sacked as manager after a string of poor results culminating in a 2–0 defeat at Preston North End.

On 12 October 2016, Steve Bruce was appointed manager. In his second match in charge, Villa defeated Reading, the club's first win in 11 games and the first away win for 14 months. 

Bruce brought in Colin Calderwood as assistant manager from Brighton & Hove Albion and Stephen Clemence from old club Hull City as first-team coach.

Transfers

Transfers in

Transfers out

Loans in

Loans out

Non-competitive

Pre-season

Competitions

Football League Championship

League table

Results summary

Results by matchday

Matches

On 22 June 2016, the fixtures for the forthcoming season were announced.

FA Cup

EFL Cup

First team squad

	

Ordered by squad number. Appearances include all competitive league and cup appearances, including as substitute.

Squad statistics

Appearances (Apps.) numbers are for appearances in competitive games only including sub appearances
Numbers in parentheses denote appearances as substitute
Red card numbers denote:   Numbers in parentheses represent red cards overturned for wrongful dismissal.

(*)Player made appearance(s) before leaving the club on loan or permanently.

Suspensions

References

Aston Villa
Aston Villa F.C. seasons